Ekoi people, also known as Ejagham, are an ethnic group in southeastern Nigeria and extending eastward into the southwest region of Cameroon. They speak the Ejagham language. Other Ekoi languages are spoken by related groups, including the Etung, some groups in Ikom (such as Ofutop, Akparabong and Nde), some groups in Ogoja (Ishibori and Bansarra), Ufia, and Yakö. The Ekoi have lived closely with the nearby Efik, Annang, Ibibio, and Igbo people of southeastern Nigeria. The Ekoi are best known for their Ekpe headdresses and the Nsibidi text. The Ejagham are the original creators of the Nsibidi ideograms and still use them as a part of tradition.

Geography
The Ekoi in Nigeria are found in Cross River State. The Ekoid languages are spoken around this area, although English (the national language) is also spoken. The Ejaham are spread out living in multiple villages called etek. Seeing a number of coconut trees or a mboma tree at the entrance or center of a village is an indication that you have entered Ejaham territory. In order to have easy access to a reliable source of water, all villages are built by a river or stream.

History 
The Ekoi originated from the Lake Ejagham area.
The Ekoi believe that the heirs of the first settlers of their present settlement own the land. Though newcomers are not allowed to buy land, they are able to purchase rights of settlement. Ekoi men have traditionally hunted, while women have engaged in fishing, agriculture, raising yams, plantains, and corn (maize). Both men and women participate in weaving.

The Ekoi people, while all speaking the same language, have not tended to live in complete unison. Living in what is now Southeast Nigeria and Southwest Cameroon, the people were physically divided by British and German colonial holdings in Africa. When a German captain named Von Weiss was killed, the European power took measures to combat the native Ekoi people (1899-1904 German-Ekoi War). However, the response was not uniform; not only were there no pitched battles, but some villages fled instead of fighting back. Moreover, Ekoi people in British-controlled Nigeria did not act to help their ethnic compatriots.

Ekoi people taken into slavery across the Atlantic were notable in Cuba, where their art, seen in the forms of drums and headdresses, survives to this day.

Culture 

The Ekoi clans are patrilineal. The Ekoi people are traditionally organized into 7 clans.

Arts 
The Ekoi culture is known for mastering the art of sculpture. The complexity of its art is a hint to the complexity of the Ekoi people's organization. Their masks are unique because unlike most traditional African masks, the Ekoi masks are fairly realistic. In the Ekoi's approach to make 2-sided masks, the darker side represented the male force, and the whiter side the female force. The wooden masks were often covered with strips of animal skin (similar to the Leopard Society's use of human skin on masks), and worn during rituals or erected on top of totems.

Body-painting and poetry are also critical to men, as they are seen simultaneously as warriors and artists. Though war has been largely uncommon in Ekoi history, except for the German-Ekoi War between 1899-1904.

Language

The Ekoi language is one of the Ekoid languages, a Bantoid language in the Niger–Congo dialect cluster. They are the creators of the  script, a script which can be seen in many surviving artifacts found in the areas inhabited by the Ekoi/Ejagham people, and which roughly translates into “cruel letters.” It is an entirely African script, with virtually no Western influence. According to Ekoi folklore, the script was taught to them by mermaids.

 ideograms convey countless concepts. There are over 12 different symbols for love, 7 different symbols for hatred, 7 different symbols for speech, 8 different symbols for mirror, 14 different symbols for a set table, and 6 different symbols for journeys. Symbols that are shaded in usually mean danger or bad fortune, and include ideas of a dead body or the death of a friend. The  script is used in the Ekoi languages and is understandable in reading and writing. The script’s importance is emphasized through its beauty and artistic aesthetics rather than its ability to shape cohesive sentences.

Ngbe and Nnimm 
The Ngbe and Nnimm societies were for males and females, respectively, in the Ekoi community. The Ngbe (Leopard) Society believed in the story of an old king named Tanze. When he died, he became a fish that was caught by a woman. A man killed the woman, created the Leopard Society, and Tanze became the body of a female drum. This tale raised the symbols of the roaring fish and the leopard as signs from God and so they would be referred to in every Ekoi court.

Initiates of Nnimm would be unmarried young girls. They would wear cursive body-painting and material dresses of calabash and shells, as well as leather necklaces. Bones of monkeys were matched with feather headdresses (the single feather at the back of the head was most important, as it was the Nnimm feather) and finished off with a cowrie-fringed wrapper. Nnimm plumes would become very important to Africans in Cuba.

Mythology 

The Ekoi have a large number of spoken stories. One creation tale tells of God creating the first man and woman and allowing them to live in a hut. God tells the man to impregnate the woman and leaves before the child is born. When the child is born, God instructs the man and woman to care for their new child. At the end of the tale it is revealed that all people are descendants of this man and woman.

Another tale that explains the natural world tells of Eagle and Ox playing hide-and-seek. Eagle finds Ox immediately and then hides on Ox’s horns where Ox cannot see him. Ox goes to every animal and asks if they had seen Eagle, but Eagle tells them all not to say anything. Finally, Fowl tells Ox that Eagle is on his horns. Enraged, Eagle seizes Fowl and swears that he will take his children for this offense. It is said that because of this, eagles eat younger fowls.

Leopards 
Leopards especially would be seen as important in Ekoi society. This included those of skull-caps with leopard’s teeth, a staff bound with leopard’s skin, and a necklace of leopard’s teeth. If they were not wary, it is believed a real leopard would attack them.

Bibliography

See also 

 Ekoid languages
 Ekoi mythology

Notes

Ekoi
Ethnic groups in Nigeria